Once in a Blue Moon may refer to:

Film and television 
 Once in a Blue Moon (1935 film), an American film directed by Ben Hecht
 Once in a Blue Moon (1995 film), a Canadian children's adventure film
 Once in a Blue Moon (2011 film) or A Ghost of a Chance, a Japanese film directed by Kōki Mitani
Once in a Blue Moon: A Celebration of Australian Musicals, a 1994 Australian television special
 "Once in a Blue Moon" (Charmed), a television episode

Literature 
 Once in a Blue Moon (comics), a 2004 graphic novel by Nunzio DeFilippis and Christina Weir
 Once in a Blue Moon (stories), a 2003 story collection by Magnus Mills

Music

Albums
 Once in a Blue Moon (Fool's Garden album) or the title song, 1993
 Once in a Blue Moon (Frankie Miller album), 1973
 Once in a Blue Moon (Phil Beer Band album), 2001
 Once in a Blue Moon (University of Texas Jazz Orchestra album) or the title song, 2000
 Once in a Blue Moon: A Celebration of Australian Musicals, a soundtrack album from the 1994 Australian television special
 Once in a Blue Moon, by Mabel Mercer, 1958

Songs
 "Once in a Blue Moon" (song), by Earl Thomas Conley, 1986
 "Once in a Blue Moon", by Lighthouse Family from the album Postcards from Heaven, 1997
 "Once in a Blue Moon", by Sydney Forest from the soundtrack album Simply Irresistible, 1999
 "Once in a Blue Moon", from the musical Summer Rain, 1983

See also 
 Once in a Very Blue Moon, a 1984 album by Nanci Griffith, or its title song
 Blue moon, a lunar event that gave rise to the expression